44 Liquormart, Inc. v. Rhode Island, 517 U.S. 484 (1996), was a United States Supreme Court case in which the Court held that a complete ban on the advertising of alcohol prices was unconstitutional under the First Amendment, and that the Twenty-first Amendment, empowering the states to regulate alcohol, did not lessen other constitutional restraints of state power.

Background 
In 1956, the Rhode Island Legislature passed two regulations restricting the content of alcohol advertisements.  The first prevented both in and out-of-state manufacturers, wholesalers, and shippers from “advertising in any manner whatsoever” the price of any alcoholic beverage offered for sale in Rhode Island. The second prevented Rhode Island news media from “mak[ing] reference to the price of any alcoholic beverages” under any circumstances.

In 1985, a liquormart brought a suit against the liquor control commissioner, arguing, among other things, that the first regulation, which prevented the liquormart from advertising its prices, was unconstitutional.  The Rhode Island Supreme Court, however, held that the regulation did not violate the First Amendment, the Commerce Clause, the Equal Protection Clause, or the Sherman Anti-Trust Act.

In the same year, the Rhode Island Liquor Stores Association filed a suit that attempted to enjoin a local Rhode Island newspaper, The Call, from advertising prices of liquor outside of the state.  In that case, the Rhode Island Supreme Court held that the second regulation was constitutional, and enjoined the newspaper from advertising out-of-state liquor prices.

In 44 Liquormart, the company 44 Liquormart Inc. owned liquor stores in Rhode Island. The other petitioner, Peoples Super Liquor Stores, Inc., operated several liquor stores in Massachusetts, which Rhode Islanders used.  The complaint original began, because 44 Liquormart attempted to run an advertisement, which the Supreme Court of the United States described as:

Because the advertisement implied that 44 Liquormart had low prices, the Rhode Island Liquor Control Administrator fined the store $400.00.  After being assessed the fine, the petitioners brought the suit, alleging that the regulation was unconstitutional.  The District Court found the regulation banning advertisements unconstitutional, because the state did not prove that the law directly advanced its interest in reducing alcohol consumption, and because the law's reach was unnecessarily extensive.

The First Circuit Court of Appeals reversed the lower court, ruling that an increase in alcohol advertisements would lead to an increase in alcohol sales and  that the Twenty-first Amendment gave Rhode Island's ban a presumption of validity.

Opinion of the Court 
Justice Stevens, writing for the plurality, reversed the First Circuit Court of Appeals.  He stated first that it was a mistake to assume that commercial speech was not entitled to protection under the First Amendment.  Relying heavily on the Court's decisions in Bigelow v. Virginia and Virginia Bd. of Pharmacy v. Virginia Citizens Consumer Council, Inc., Stevens concluded that the Court's "early cases uniformly struck down several broadly based bans on truthful, nonmisleading commercial speech, each of which served ends unrelated to consumer protection."  He did note, however, that the Court has at the same time recognized that states may regulate commercial advertising to a greater degree than non-commercial advertising.

While Stevens essentially reaffirmed the principle that states have a wider latitude to regulate commercial speech, he stated that Rhode Island had gone too far.  Specifically, he stated that the Court has, in the past, been wary of the "dangers" of outright content-based bans on commercial speech.  He further stated: 

Having described the regulation as a "paternal" one, which assumes that the public will respond badly to the truth, the Stevens court then went on to address Rhode Island's argument that it had "substantial interest" in promoting temperance.  Stevens, however, did not give much weight to this argument, because the state provided no findings of fact showing that the ban actually did promote temperance.

Stevens further rejected Rhode Island's argument that because the facts supporting or opposing a conclusion that the total ban did, in fact, promote temperance could "go both ways," the First Circuit Court of Appeals was correct in deferring to the legislature.  In rejecting the state's argument, Stevens called into question the Supreme Court's ruling in Posadas de Puerto Rico Associates v. Tourism Company of Puerto Rico, which was extremely deferential to the legislature.

Finally, Stevens quickly rejected Rhode Island's contention that the Twenty-first Amendment gave the state the power to enforce the complete advertising ban.  He conceded that the Amendment did give the state's greater ability to regulate alcohol without violating the dormant commerce clause, but that it did not "license the States to ignore their obligations under other provisions of the Constitution.”

Concurrences 
Stevens wrote for the majority as to Parts I, II, VII, and VIII.  The major holdings from these sections were that the Twenty-first Amendment did not "save" Rhode Island's total ban from unconstitutionality and the result that the ban was unconstitutional.

Stevens, in Parts III and V, which were joined by Justice Ginsburg and Justice Kennedy, and Justice Souter, stated that the First Amendment allowed for greater regulation of commercial advertising than non-commercial advertising.

Stevens, in Part IV, which was joined by Justice Kennedy and Justice Ginsburg, concluded that not all commercial advertising is as protected as other types of commercial advertising.

Stevens, in Part VI, which was joined by Justice Kennedy, Justice Ginsburg, and Justice Thomas, rejected the Court's reasoning in Posadas.

References

External links 

Case brief: Quimbee

United States Supreme Court cases
United States Supreme Court cases of the Rehnquist Court
United States commercial speech case law
1996 in United States case law
Legal history of Rhode Island
United States Twenty-first Amendment case law
Advertising regulation
Alcohol law in the United States